Discophora, commonly known as the duffers is a genus of butterflies in the family Nymphalidae. The members are confined to India, China and Southeast Asia.

Species
Discophora bambusae C. & R. Felder, [1867]
Discophora celinde (Stoll, [1790])
Discophora deo de Nicéville, 1898
Discophora dodong Schröder & Treadaway, 1981
Discophora lepida (Moore, 1857)
Discophora necho C. & R. Felder, [1867]
Discophora ogina (Godart, [1824])
Discophora philippina Moore, [1895]
Discophora simplex Staudinger, 1889
Discophora sondaica Boisduval, 1836
Discophora timora Westwood, [1850]

References

External links
Images representing Discophora at BOLD
Images representing Discophora at EOL

Amathusiini
Nymphalidae genera
Taxa named by Arthur Gardiner Butler